The Culture and Congress Centre in Lucerne (or KKL for Kultur- und Kongresszentrum Luzern) is a multi-functional building with a concert hall that is esteemed for its high-profile acoustics.

It was built according to the plans of the architect Jean Nouvel and was inaugurated in 1998 with a concert by the Berlin Philharmonic Orchestra under the direction of Claudio Abbado.

References

External links 

Buildings and structures in Lucerne
Concert halls in Switzerland
Jean Nouvel buildings
Lucerne Festival
Tourist attractions in the canton of Lucerne